The Celestials are fictional characters appearing in American comic books published by Marvel Comics. Depicted as cosmic beings, they debuted in the Bronze Age of Comic Books and have reappeared on numerous occasions.

They also appeared in the Marvel Cinematic Universe live-action films Guardians of the Galaxy (2014), Guardians of the Galaxy Vol. 2 (2017), Eternals (2021), and Thor: Love and Thunder (2022).

Publication history 
The Celestials debuted in The Eternals #1 (July 1976) and were created by writer and artist Jack Kirby. They reappeared as regular guest stars in three subsequent limited series sequels: The Eternals vol. 2 #1–12 (Oct. 1985–Sept. 1986), Eternals vol. 3 #1–7 (Aug. 2006-Feb. 2007), and Eternals vol. 4 #1–9 (Aug. 2008–May 2009).

The characters have also been featured in other titles, including the "Celestial Saga" storyline in Thor Annual #7 (1978), Thor #283–300 (May 1979–Oct. 1980), Thor #387–389 (Jan.–March 1988), Quasar #24 (July 1991), Fantastic Four #400 (May 1995), X-Factor #43–46 (Aug.–Nov. 1989) and #48–50 (Dec. 1989–Jan. 1990). The first detailed account of the Celestials' origin was finally presented in The Ultimates 2 #6 (2017).

Fictional history 
The origin of the Celestials was long unknown, with many species across the mainstream Marvel Universe having only unconfirmed legends about their beginnings—until the so-called Eternity War, when major revelations about the Celestials were revealed by the mysterious cosmic entity the Queen of Nevers.

At the beginning of creation itself, countless billions of years ago, before the current Cosmic Order, creation was composed of a single and sentient universe, whose omnipotent intelligence was referred to as the First Firmament. For countless ages, the First Firmament was the sole being in creation, until its loneliness became unbearable. It decided to create the first life in Creation to give it companions as well as servants—an act that it would come to regret. These servants, cosmic beings of a lesser order of power, were of two kinds: black and multicolored humanoid servants. The black servants dutifully obeyed and worshiped their creator. They even created their own servants and sought to preserve the simple order their creator had made complete and unchanging for all time. The First Firmament named these loyal beings Aspirants and was very pleased by their goals and desire to maintain the status quo of its reign. However, the multicolored ones had completely different values and desires from the Aspirants. Considered "rebels" by the First Firmament, they wanted a dynamic, diverse and continually evolving Reality where beings lived, learned, reproduced, aged and died to slowly improve themselves through evolution. The rebels wanted this with the ultimate long-term goal of producing superior cosmic beings with the power to create universes of their own and for the universe to evolve with them as they advanced towards that state. These were the beings whom one day would be called by lesser life forms, "The Celestials".

The two opposing factions of the First Firmament's children could not peacefully co-exist and the ensuing war nearly destroyed the first universe. It was powered by a cosmic artifact later called the Heart of The Voldi (named after the species which would adopt it) and operated by genetically engineered pilots. During the war, the Godkiller destroyed countless billions of Celestials and brought them to the brink of extinction. At this point, for unknown reasons, a civil war broke out among the Aspirants that led to the Godkiller being stripped of critical parts for weapons. This division within the Aspirants gave the Celestials a chance to recover and make their last stand. In the final battle against the Aspirants, the Celestials detonated their ultimate weapons that tore the First Firmament apart and very nearly killed it. In a desperate act of self-preservation, the core essence of the First Firmament took the surviving Aspirants and fled outside Reality. In the wake of its near destruction, the major fragments of the First Universe that were torn off coalesced into a new cosmic being, one with multiple realities composing it. This was the birth of the Second Cosmos and the First Multiverse. After the birth of the first Multiverse, the "rebels" settled inside him, multiplied and began their vast plan to create and nurture transitory but evolving life on the newborn worlds within, a general outline of the basic plan the Celestials follow for shaping the evolution of life on a chosen planet after it develops primitive sentient life.

This initial visit is called a First Host of Celestials, after the chosen planet has been judged to possess the needed properties for an effective "seeding". The Celestials then return for follow-up visits or "Hosts", during which they monitor the subject planet's progress and make whatever modifications or interventions they deem appropriate. These Hosts have been documented on Earth, and have also been found on many other planets throughout the universe. Other major examples include the Skrull homeworld, hundreds of millions of years ago, and numerous Sh'iar worlds, such as Gladiator's homeworld.

First Host on Earth
Collecting a number of natives during the Stone Age, they then begin genetic experimentation to determine the species' future development. They create two subspecies from the natives: Eternals, Deviants, and a majority "normal" strain that may or may not be modified in some manner that enhances its long-term development. For example, the Celestials first visited Earth nearly a million years ago and implanted a special genetic code into the early hominids. This implanted DNA structure has been revealed to be not only the source of the ability of select random humans to develop superpowers upon exposure to dangerous environmental catalysts, it also allowed for the development of benevolent mutations that caused the existence of inborn potential superpowers in mutants. In truth, the Celestials came to Earth to investigate the disappearance of a Celestial only to realize Earth might eventually create antibodies against the Horde infection via its powered inhabitants.

Second Host
Approximately 21,000 years ago, the Celestials returned to Earth for the Second Host and found that the Deviants had created a vast empire across the world based on the continent of Lemuria, where they had conquered most of the primitive human tribes with their superior technology. They were also about to go to war with the original human inhabitants of the neighboring continent of Atlantis. The Celestials then destroyed Lemuria and sank it under the ocean, utterly shattering the Deviants' empire and indirectly sinking Atlantis-therefore destroying both continents and reshaping the Earth.

Third and Fourth Host
Resenting the presence of the Celestials and their monitoring of Earth's progress, the Skyfather figures of Earth (e.g. Odin, Zeus) attempted to stop the Third Host, but were quickly outmatched. The Space Gods then informed they would return 1,000 years later to judge Earth's right to continue existing.

The Skyfathers then developed a convoluted plan to stop the Fourth Host via the use of the Odinsword and Destroyer armour, but once again the Celestials prevented the offensive and melted the Destroyer armour into slag, scattering the Asgardians' life forces. The Earthmothers (such as Frigga and Hera) of Earth, however, had planned a peaceful solution and made an offering of twelve perfect humans, which was accepted, and the planet was spared judgment. Exitar terraforms the planet in question into a garden paradise, with only the "evil" inhabitants having been destroyed. On one occasion, the hero Quasar observes a race completely failing the genetic test, with every living creature being destroyed with their planet.

The Fulcrum
The Celestials' actions conflicted with the policy of "non-interference" practiced by fellow cosmic entities the Watchers, with the two races becoming enemies. The Celestials and their "opposites", the locusts of the universe, cosmic insect-like beings that would eventually be called the Horde, are established as instruments of an entity referred to as The Fulcrum (apparently an aspect of the One Above All),  their purpose to be "instruments of the planting/creation/teeming of the universe".

Knowhere - The City Inside A Celestial's Head
One of the Celestials to first enter into the Abyss left after the destruction of the 6th Cosmos encountered the dark elder god Knull and picked him up to examine him. Enraged over the Celestials despoiling the Abyss through their creation of the 7th Cosmos, Knull manifested a blade of living abyss from his shadow - creating the first All-Black The Necrosword - and decapitated the Celestial, thereby marking it as the first death in the renewed Multiverse.

A team of space adventurers, the Guardians of the Galaxy, find and use as a base the severed head of a Celestial floating in an area of space known as "The Rip". Dubbed "Knowhere", the structure also acts as a common port of call (complete with a market and bar) for travelers from all points in the space-time continuum. The base is administered by its chief of security, Cosmo, a telepathic and telekinetic Soviet space dog originally lost in Earth orbit in the 1960s. Courtesy of the deceased Celestial's "Continuum Cortex", travelers with special "passport" bracelets can teleport to any point in the universe instantaneously.

X-Termination
In the beginning, the Celestials were foolish to play god and thought that with life and creation, there must be also death and destruction, so they created the Exterminators to be that death and destruction. Their creation turned on them and since they were unable to kill their creation, they imprisoned the Exterminators to the walls that separated realities. Learning from their mistakes, they eventually created the Death Seed with the same purpose. The Exterminators remained there for millennia, until the walls began to crack and started to teleport between universes, which weakened the walls even more and were able to escape. Dark Beast and an alternate version of Beast used the Dreaming Celestial to open a portal to go through Earth-295, which caused one of the Exterminators to travel to Earth-616 and drained the Dreaming Celestial. Bosnos the seventh and most supreme of the celestials was sent to clean up after the destruction the Exterminators left behind. Combating early decisions of needing a more exponential race and to implant the universal numbers. Bosnos was Born.

The End of the Seventh Multiverse
During the "Time Runs Out" storyline, the Beyonders are revealed to have killed all the Celestials in each reality across the multiverse, to perform an experiment by destroying the Seventh Multiverse.

The birth of the Eighth Multiverse
A number of Celestials from across the multiverse had survived the Beyonders' attack, however, having taken shelter within the folds of space-time. They were planning to reenter the Multiverse after it was reborn after the "Secret Wars" event. This rebirth however had an unforeseen consequence: it provided an opening for the embittered First Firmament, who had been patiently waiting Outside, to attack the newly reborn, and therefore greatly weakened Eternity, with the goal of destroying the multiverse and restoring itself to the center of creation. The Firmament first chained and then began infiltrating Eternity with both its loyal Aspirant agents and taking control over the lesser cosmic entities that protected the cosmic balance in its component universes. Under the Firmament's influence, Master Order and Lord Chaos destroyed the reborn Living Tribunal in front of Galactus the Lifebringer and then found their servant, The In-Betweener and forcibly merged into a new cosmic being many orders of magnitude of power greater that called itself Logos. Logos then located the surviving Celestials and destroyed all but one of them who was rescued by The Queen of Nevers.

The Fifth Host
Later, while observing the last stand against the First Firmament, The Queen of Nevers reveals the reason why she had saved the One Above All. By using him as a seed, she raises the Celestials anew as her own Avatars of Possible in what she claims to be the Fifth Host. The Celestials then faced and defeated the Aspirants of the First Firmament.

The Final Host
Later it was revealed that during the Stone Age, a Celestial referred to as "The Fallen" came to Earth. It was described as "deranged" as it dug into the Earth apparently searching for something. Due to the danger it posed, the Avengers of the Stone Age fought the Fallen and defeated it before burying it deep underground in the modern-day country of South Africa, where it was found and awakened by a group of archaeologists after they uncovered the cavern it was sealed in. The Fallen then summoned the Final Host while killing the archaeologists and soon afterwards was approached by Loki, the Asgardian God of Mischief, for unknown purposes.

The secret origin of the new Marvel Universe
Some time later, Celestials began literally "raining" down on Earth forcing the Avengers to reunite again and just in time to see the arrival of the Final Host which is composed of Dark Celestials that are each physically unique and were the ones who easily took down their brethren. Soon afterwards it appeared that these Dark Celestials are in league with the Horde of bugs pouring out of the center of the planet and with Loki. In an attempt to learn more about the Celestials, Iron Man and Doctor Strange visited the Eternals, only to find them all dead or dying from self-inflicted wounds. Ikaris was found barely alive and used his last words to reveal to Iron Man that the Uni-mind was the only thing that can stop the Final Host from fully unleashing the Horde, as the existence of a dead Celestial that Loki calls the Progenitor is revealed.

The Progenitor is actually the first Celestial to ever set foot on Earth, when it was an insignificant speck of molten mud and utterly lifeless. He came to Earth not because of some grand cosmic design or godly destiny nor did he even consciously choose the planet, he came merely because he was dying and falling. As it turns out, even the omnipotent Celestials get sick, and the Progenitor was hopelessly infected by the Horde. As the Progenitor died, his blood and rotting flesh mixed into the shifting primordial elements of the newly formed planet and thus affected the course of Earth evolution as it made the planet a unique breeding ground for all the super-powered beings one day to come.

Five billion years after the death of the Progenitor and his corpse's incorporation into Earth's "primordial soup", another Celestial eventually followed looking for him. This was The Fallen, who was known as Zgreb the Aspirant, the lover of the Progenitor and according to Loki, it became mad by the sight of its dead lover, or perhaps by the effect of the Horde latching onto him. In any event, Odin and his Prehistoric Avengers took on this Celestial, leaving it for dead deep in the Earth. Eventually, the disappearance of two Celestials brought down The First Host to Earth. They made quick work of the Prehistoric Avengers but left after the battle, rather than destroy the Avengers or the Earth. Loki surmises that the Celestials feared succumbing to the Horde themselves and believed it better to leave Zgreb buried deep underground to keep the Horde infection contained, creating in the process two opposing humanoid species – the Eternals and the Deviants - to defend the process under the false impression that they were actually protecting the human race.

Dark Celestials
When Loki revived Zgreb from his long slumber deep in the Earth, he discovered that the Horde did not kill Zgreb, instead they transformed him into Zgreb the Sorrower, a new breed known as Dark Celestial. Together with the rest of his kind, collectively known as the Final Host, they've killed or infected every other Celestial, the dead bodies of whom now litter the Earth, feeding the Horde.

As the entire planet panics due to the Final Host actions, the heroes finally realize why the Celestials did not cleanse planet Earth when they had the chance, they saw the potential to grow an antidote to defeat the Horde and so they waited, visiting the planet now and then to see if the cure had been developed. Eventually the world breathes a sigh of relief as the Avengers, combining their powers through the Uni-Mind (given to Iron Man by Ikaris) purged the Earth of the Horde, curing the infected Celestials. The newly revived Celestials then defeat the Dark Celestials.

Infinity Wars
In the 2018 Infinity Wars event, as the Infinity Stones are gathered once again, Loki dupes his own version of the Infinity Watch within the Soul World, stealing the six Stones belonging to the main Marvel universe from Gamora. He does so to dive deep into the Quarry of the Gods at the end of time, believing unlimited power awaits him there. But as he enters, he discovers the Stones hold no power in the bottom of the quarry, becoming just ordinary rocks. More so, he sees the area littered with thousands of Stones, confirming that this quarry is where these powerful artifacts originated and are actively mined. Loki immediately recognizes the miners as a squad of unique Celestials (this new group could very well be the oldest of their kind) who are clearly manipulating the fate of the multiverse by spreading the stones out across all the multiverse.

King in Black
During the "King in Black" storyline, three Celestials are shown to have been slain by Knull, with their corpses being possessed by his symbiotes. Thor and Knull later fight and Thor gains the upper hand until Knull distracts Thor by bringing in his symbiote-possessed Celestials and stabs Thor in the back. Iron Man arrives to use his Extremis-infected Symbiote Dragon to take control of the symbiote-possessed Celestials.

A.X.E.: Judgment Day
During the "A.X.E.: Judgment Day" storyline, the Avengers and the Eternals that did not side with Druig work to revive the Progenitor (which became the Avengers Mountain) when Druig awakens the Hex to attack Krakoa. This was not to be a simple resurrection. Instead, they would re-write the "programming" of the Celestial, creating a being with ideals more aligned with their own. This new God would, if they succeeded, forcibly end Druig's war. Upon waking, the Progenitor did just that and ordered the Hex to leave. However, the Progenitor also quickly surmised that the inhabitants of Earth had driven it to ruin, so he declared they would have twenty-four hours to prove themselves more good than evil, else he would destroy the world. He immediately takes notice of Captain America, whom he harshly judges and declares a failure. The Progenitor is also well aware of its own weaknesses and showed the Avengers, X-Men, Eternals and essentially all of mankind a future of its death which also significantly devastated mankind. The Progenitor was skilled enough to fool even Jean Grey. He then continues its judgment declaring Emma Frost, Destiny, and Mystique as failures citing them as proof that the civilians of Earth cannot lay their trust in heroes to save them. It does give Kro positive judgment and will consider the others longer. Cyclops later visited the Progenitor in the Arctic. As it starts to pass it's judgment, Cyclops states that he requests a change of venue stating that Jean Grey is the only one who can judge him and that his fellow X-Men might scold him later. The Progenitor gives Cyclops a positive judgment. While the Progenitor has also passed positive judgment on the Deviants, it also gave positive judgment to Phastos, negative judgment to Makkari, deferred Ajak's judgment, and will consider Ikaris' judgment longer. Eventually after many judgments the Progenitor judged humanity as unworthy and while the heroes of the planet united against it, they were nevertheless defeated. The Progenitor demanded the Machine that is Earth to self-destruct, but the Machine refused and Phastos was able to reset it before the Progenitor could cause it to explode. Meanwhile, some of the Eternals, X-Men, Sinister, and Stark infiltrated the Celestial to activate its own self-destruct while continuing to be judged by the Progenitor. Upon reaching the core, they convinced the Progenitor that it itself is not worthy which resulted in it undoing every death it caused and reverted back to Avengers Mountain. It also empowered Ajak so that she could be the god the Progenitor could not. However, an aspect of the Progenitors' consciousness still exists and continues to observe the world and its inhabitants. It also communicated with Starbrand and told her things she should know, like the fact that her powers were shortening her lifespan.

Known Celestials 
 Arishem the Judge: A Celestial tasked with judging whether the civilization of a planet will live or die.
 Ashema the Listener: A Celestial tasked, along with Nezarr the Calculator, with retrieving Franklin Richards for evaluation as a new member of the Celestials.
 The Blue Celestial: The first Celestial with a documented birth.
 Callus the Void: One of the Celestials turned into a Dark Celestial.
 Celestial Destructor: A member of the Aspirants, he was sent by the First Firmament to cause as much damage to Eternity as possible. He was confronted by the Avengers, X-Men, Ultimates and other countless heroes and was banished by the magic users with the use of a spell from the Book of the Vishanti.
 The Celestial Gardener: A Celestial tasked with the maintenance of the Apocalypse entity on Earth.
 The Celestial Madonna: A Celestial who had arrived in 114 A.D. at Zhang Heng's palace. She was "pregnant" at the time and wanted to consume either Earth or the Moon to survive, but Zhang Heng convinced her to instead consume the Sun, which killed her immediately.
 Devron the Experimenter: A young Celestial tasked with watching over Earth alongside Gamiel the Manipulator.
 The Dreaming Celestial: Originally known as Tiamut the Communicator; a renegade Celestial.
 Ea the Wise:
 Eson the Searcher: The Celestial tasked with "seeking."
 Exitar the Exterminator: A Celestial tasked with the destruction of life on worlds that fail the Celestials' tests.
 The Fallen a.k.a. Zgreb the Aspirant: A deranged Celestial that came to Earth during the Stone Age, apparently searching for something. This Celestial was actually the lover of the Progenitor and was searching for him before it was defeated and left for dead deep in the Earth by Odin and his Prehistoric Avengers. When Loki revived Zgreb from its long slumber, he discovered that the Horde did not kill Zgreb; instead the Horde transformed it into a Dark Celestial, now known as Zgreb the Sorrower.
 Gamiel the Manipulator: A young Celestial tasked with watching over Earth alongside Devron the Experimenter.
 Gammenon the Gatherer: A Celestial tasked with collecting samples of all life forms present on a planet during a Celestial Host.
 Godhead: A silent Celestial who was tasked to observe the planet Viscardi. After the inhabitants revealed their desire to become powerful like him, he created The Black Vortex.
 Geun the Executioner: A Human scientist turned Celestial.
 Groffon the Regurger: A obscure Celestial who destroys planets. He is killed by Deadpool when trying to destroy Earth.
 Hargen the Measurer: A Celestial tasked with measuring or quantifying the planets the Celestials survey.
 Jemiah the Analyzer: A Celestial tasked with analyzing life-form samples.
Kahltro the Tinkerer: A Celestial tasked with creating instruments of destruction.
 Marazov the Penitent: A Human scientist turned Celestial.
 Nezarr the Calculator: A Celestial who is a mathematician and possesses the ability to project illusions
 Neena the Luck Dragon: The superhero Domino, she transformed into a Celestial by the Creation Constellation to stop Geun. Domino Hotshot #5 
 The One Above All: The leader of the Celestials and temporarily marked as the last living Celestial. He is not to be confused with One-Above-All.
 Obliteron: One of the Celestials that was turned into a Dark Celestial.
 Oneg the Prober: A Celestial tasked with experimentation and implementation.
 The Progenitor: The first Celestial to visit Earth. This Celestial had been infected, while traveling in deep space, by the Horde which eventually killed him. A new version of the Progenitor was later resurrected to end the Eternals' war against the mutant nation of Krakoa. This Celestial then began judging whether the civilization of planet Earth will live or die.
 The Red Celestial: The Celestial tasked with helping to birth the Blue Celestial.
 The Red/Blue Judge: The Celestial tasked with judging whether the civilization of a planet will live or die.
 Scathan the Approver: A Celestial from the alternate timeline/reality Earth-691 who is tasked with approving or disapproving situations. It seems that Scathan also exists in Earth-616, the Prime Marvel Universe.
 Star Child: A "Variant Celestial", the son of the Celestial Madonna. He was born on the sun following the death of his mother and was retrieved by Leonardo da Vinci.
 Xodus the Forgotten: A mutant M'Kraan evolved into a Celestial at Earth-92131.
 Tefral the Surveyor: A Celestial tasked with surveying and mapping the geography of planets.
 Valknar the Exhumer: One of the Celestials that was turned into a Dark Celestial.
 Ziran the Tester: A Celestial tasked with testing the stability of the genetic material of life forms they alter.

Biology 
They weigh an average of 260 tons, meaning they are far denser than air. They are capable of feats such as reducing the Asgardian construct known as the Destroyer to slag, moving planets at will, and creating and containing entire pocket universes. Reed Richards theorized that the Celestials' source of power was Hyperspace itself – the source of all energy in the Marvel Universe. The characters are almost invulnerable, and have only been harmed in rare instances, before instantly regenerating. 

The first murder of a Celestial (which was also the first murder of the current multiverse) was carried out by the God of the Abyss, Knull, using the first Necrosword. The first known assassination of a Celestial was carried out by the Apocalypse Twins, who used the divinely-enchanted axe "Jarnbjorn" to pierce Celestial armor, against the Celestial Gardener. Composed of Asgardian Steel, "Jarnbjorn" was unable to pierce the Celestial-armored Apocalypse until Thor blessed the axe with his blood. The now-lost hyperweapon, Godkiller, a space-borne humanoid robot which dwarfs even the Celestials themselves, was claimed to have destroyed Celestials literally by the billions. 

New Celestials may be born by consuming the mass of the Black Galaxy, a place made out pure biological and organic matter, or with planets which were implanted with Celestial eggs/embryos at the core and after millions of years they would be born and would consume the planet, similar to the Celestials of Earth X. However, there are other ways for a Celestial to be born as witnessed with the Celestial Madonna who was carrying an infant Celestial. The Celestials also have an immune system, consisting of armored behemoths, jellyfish-like antibodies and a swarm creature with wings and tentacles, which can fire blasts from their eye. The Celestials are all telepathically linked to one-another no matter the distance.

Thanos, wielding the Infinity Gauntlet, ranked the Celestials as being on roughly the same scale of power as Galactus, the Stranger, Odin, and Zeus, but below that of Mistress Love, Lord Chaos, and Master Order.

Reception

Accolades 

 In 2020, CBR.com ranked the Celestials 3rd in their "Marvel's 10 Most Powerful Giants" list.
 In 2021, CBR.com ranked the Celestials 1st in their "10 Strongest Characters From Eternals Comics" list and 8th in their "Marvel: The 10 Strongest Cosmic Entities" list and 8th in their "10 Bravest Gods In Marvel Comics" list.
 In 2022, Screen Rant ranked the Celestials 7th in their "16 Most Powerful Cosmic Characters In Marvel Comics" list.

Other versions 
The characters also appear in the 1999 alternate universe limited series Earth X, appearing as beings of energy encased in armor composed of vibranium, a metal with properties that prevent their dissipation. They reproduce by planting a fragment of their essence in a planet, which matures into a new Celestial over the course of eons. As a form of protection of that growing Celestial, its "parents" would manipulate the DNA of a planet's dominant life form to gain super-abilities and unknowingly act as antibodies, protecting the planet until the Celestial is born. The cosmic entity Galactus opposes them, devouring planets that incubate Celestial "eggs" to prevent the Celestials from overpopulating the universe.

In the Ultimate Marvel universe, the Celestials are a race of powerful metahumans led by Shen Xorn.

In the alternate reality of the 1998 miniseries Mutant X, the Celestials openly opposed the Goblin Entity, an all powerful being that consumed entire galaxies and the polar opposite of the Phoenix Force. While they were ultimately successful in imprisoning their enemy, they would die from the injuries they sustained during the battle. The Goblin Entity escaped its prison several years later by attaching itself to the life force of Madelyne Pryor.

The Celestials of Earth-4280 were convinced they were gods and attempted to conquer the Multiverse by use of the Bridge, a device created by Reed Richards that allows its users to observe and enter alternate worlds. They were defeated by the combined forces of Galactus and a Franklin Richards from an alternate future.

In X-Men '92, the race known as the M'Kraan had developed mutants who then evolved into Celestials, such as Xodus the Harvester who thought that the mutants from other worlds would replace his kind.

What If? Secret Wars features a version of Doctor Doom with the powers of the Beyonder and the Infinity Gauntlet who had defeated the Celestials.

In other media

Film
 The Celestials are featured in media set within the Marvel Cinematic Universe. As in the comics, their origin and nature are shrouded in mystery. Whatever can be known about them is known only by a few, such as Taneleer Tivan / The Collector, who reveals that the Celestials utilized the Infinity Stones as a means of power against lesser life forms.
 The severed head of a deceased Celestial was converted into Knowhere and appears in the live-action films Guardians of the Galaxy (2014) and Avengers: Infinity War (2018), and the animated Disney+ series What If...? (2021). Knowhere is used as a congregation hub for space travelers, and the Tivan Group set up mining operations within it to harvest valuable resources. 
 In Guardians of the Galaxy, footage of Eson the Searcher is shown using the Power Stone to destroy a planet. 
 In Guardians of the Galaxy Vol. 2, Ego the Living Planet, Peter Quill / Star-Lord's biological father, is a Celestial who controls a humanoid avatar to travel the universe. His planetary form is a living extension of his Celestial consciousness. Over the course of many years, he planted thousands of alien seedlings to expand his existence across all life-sustaining planets. However, Ego needed another Celestial's assistance to activate them, so he fathered children with various alien races and had Yondu Udonta retrieve them so he could gauge their Celestial powers. Quill is the only child who gained his father's Celestial abilities, though he loses them after killing Ego and foiling his plans.
 In Eternals, Arishem the Judge, Nezarr the Calculator, Jemiah the Analyzer, and Hargen the Measurer appear. Here, they are shown to stabilize the universe with their infinite powers and to plant seeds of their species in planets, destroying them in the process. To control those planets' population growth, they made the Deviants. But when they disobeyed the Celestials' will, the latter created the Eternals. Arishem has a greater rank than other Celestials. Tiamut the Communicator almost emerged from Earth, but was turned to marble by Sersi after she and the others joined in a Uni-Mind.
 In Thor: Love and Thunder, a Celestial Gardener and a Mad Celestial were seen outside the Council of Godheads chamber when Thor's group was fleeing from Omnipotence City.

Theme parks
 Eson the Searcher is the main antagonist of Guardians of the Galaxy: Cosmic Rewind (near the location of Wonders of Xandar Pavilion) at Epcot, where he steals a Cosmic Generator from Nova Corps to create a portal to the dawn of time to erase the Earth from existence, resulting in a chase where the Guardians, Nova Corps, and riders work together to get it back.

Video games
 Eson the Searcher appears in Lego Marvel Super Heroes 2. Kang the Conqueror uses his time crystal to summon the Searcher to fight the Guardians of the Galaxy.
 An unnamed Celestial appears as a boss character in Marvel Ultimate Alliance 3: The Black Orders Black Order Expansion Pass. After Doctor Doom steals the Soul Stone from Black Panther, the former uses it to resurrect a Celestial so he can protect the universe from an entity awakened following a clash between Thanos and Thane. While the heroes defeat the Celestial, Mister Fantastic realizes Doom's motives and convinces him to join the heroes to stop the new threat instead.

References

External links 
 
 Celestials at Comic Vine
 Celestials at Marvel Cinematic Universe Wiki
 25 Things That Make No Sense About Marvel’s Celestials at Screenrant

Mythology in Marvel Comics
Characters created by Jack Kirby
Marvel Comics alien species
Fictional characters who can manipulate reality